The Canadian Seaman's Union was a trade union in Canada which organized among sailors. Affiliated with the Trades and Labor Congress of Canada, it was established in 1936 and gained prominence during World War II. After the war, it was red-baited and crushed by opposition from the Canadian government, shipping companies, and the Seafarers' International Union.

Presidents
1935: Pat Sullivan
1947: Harry Davis

References

Defunct trade unions in Canada
Trade unions established in 1936
Trade unions disestablished in 1950
Seafarers' trade unions
Water transport in Canada
1936 establishments in Canada